Ninth Street is a station on the PATH system. Located at the intersection of 9th Street and Sixth Avenue (Avenue of the Americas) in the Greenwich Village neighborhood of Manhattan, New York City, it is served by the Hoboken–33rd Street and Journal Square–33rd Street lines on weekdays, and by the Journal Square–33rd Street (via Hoboken) line on weekends.

History

The construction of the Ninth Street station was particularly difficult. In 1900, construction workers for the Hudson and Manhattan Railroad (H&M), the PATH's predecessor, had to navigate quicksand formed from the water of the former Minetta Creek above it. Their work was particularly difficult as they could not break the surface of Sixth Avenue, which would have disrupted traffic. In 1907, the Degnon Contracting Company was building an extension to the H&M Railroad north of 9th Street and declared the water to have dried up, to the relief of area property owners who had previously spent thousands of dollars on pumps to rid their properties of water.

The station opened on February 25, 1908, as part of the H&M extension between New Jersey and 33rd Street. Originally, there was an exit on the west side of Sixth Avenue between Waverly Place and Greenwich Avenue. The exit had been removed by 1941.

After the September 11, 2001 attacks, which resulted in the destruction of the vital World Trade Center station, Ninth Street experienced serious overcrowding. In 2002, Ninth Street was used by an average of 8,900 people per day, about 3.248 million per annum. This was 54% higher than the 1.496 million passengers that utilized this station in 2001. While a new station near the World Trade Center has since reopened, the Port Authority plans to build a second entrance (pending environmental review) at this station, despite local opposition to the project. Residents were concerned that the project would endanger the surrounding neighborhood's fragile historic buildings (through the vibrations that major construction would cause) and disrupt business and traffic in the West Village.

Station layout

In keeping with the "style" of PATH station entrances in Manhattan, the Ninth Street entrance is in the side of a building on the east side of Sixth Avenue. Passengers travel down a number of stairwells and through a narrow curved tunnel before descending to the north end of the platform. This underground station has two tracks and a center island platform. It is located under Christopher Street, just southwest of where the PATH tracks curve under 6th Avenue. The IND Sixth Avenue Line's local tracks are to the east of the PATH tracks, and the express tracks underneath, and are not visible from this station.

Just east of the station, the tracks curve north onto Sixth Avenue, while the tunnel continues straight, a provision for a level junction with a never-built branch line that would have run to Astor Place on the IRT Lexington Avenue Line. Large portions of the ring erecting machine from the original tunnel construction is in the bellmouth for the proposed extension, and the tunnel is also filled with equipment.

Nearby attractions
 Jefferson Market Library
 The New School
 New York University 
 Washington Square Park

References

External links 

PATH - Ninth Street Station
PATH's Plan For More Station Entrances in the West Village Continues from New York University's Livewire
 Ninth Street entrance from Google Maps Street View
 Platform from Google Maps Street View

PATH stations in Manhattan
Sixth Avenue
Greenwich Village
Railway stations in the United States opened in 1908
West Village
1908 establishments in New York City
Railway stations located underground in New York (state)